Oeneis norna, the Norse grayling, is a species of butterfly in the subfamily Satyrinae, that occurs throughout Scandinavia and the northern Palearctic.

Description
It is extremely variable, and the smaller, lighter O. norna often resemble O. bore.

Range and habitat
This species can be found in northern Norway, Sweden, and Finland. In Russia it is seen in the Ural Mountains, Yamal Peninsula, Kola Peninsula, and Siberia. It is also encountered in Japan. Within its range it lives in bogs, damp grassy areas and mossy forest clearings.

Subspecies
 Oeneis norna altaica (Elwes, 1899)
 Oeneis norna tundra (A. Bang-Haas, 1912)
 Oeneis norna radnaevi (Churkin, 1999)
 Oeneis norna arethusoides (Lukhtanov, 1989)
 Oeneis norna rosovi (Kurentzov, 1970)
 Oeneis norna tshukota (Korshunov, 1998)
 Oeneis norna asamana (Matsumura, 1919)
 Oeneis norna sugitanii (Shirôzu, 1952)
 Oeneis norna hilda (Quensel, 1791)

Life cycle
There is one flight a year between mid-June and July. It takes two seasonal cycles for the caterpillars to completely develop. Once the caterpillars hatch many will die without even attempting to eat.

Host plants
 Phleum pratense
 Poa alpina
 Carex species
 Nardus species

References

"Oeneis Hübner, [1819]" at Markku Savela's Lepidoptera and Some Other Life Forms

Oeneis
Butterflies of Europe
Insects of the Arctic